Peter Bürgel (born March 22, 1953) is a German politician, representative of the Christian Social Union of Bavaria.

He has been particularly active in his home town of Dachau, known as an artists colony. In 2007 he was elected President of Bürgel EuroArt.

See also
List of Bavarian Christian Social Union politicians

References

External links
Official site

Christian Social Union in Bavaria politicians
1953 births
Living people